Royse City High School is a public secondary school located in Royse City, Texas, United States and is the only high school in the Royse City Independent School District. The current building opened in the fall of 2006, and is located in the southwestern part of Hunt County. The school serves students from Collin County, Hunt County, and Rockwall County. In 2011, the school was rated "Academically Acceptable" by the Texas Education Agency. The school garnered national attention when a student wore a Confederate flag as a cape on campus, April 23, 2019; subsequently, "white power" was shouted at a black television reporter from a vehicle leaving the school.

Notable alumni
 Taylor Hearn, class of 2012 – professional baseball pitcher for the Texas Rangers.
G.C. Mule Dowell, Class of 1931, Collegiate Football Texas Tech University, Professional Football Player Chicago Cardinals, Hall of Fame Texas Tech University, Hall of Honor Texas Tech University, https://www.tiki-toki.com/timeline/entry/306235/Texas-Tech-Athletics-Hall-of-Fame/#vars!date=1963-01-25_14:19:14!

References

External links

 

Schools in Hunt County, Texas
Public high schools in Texas